The Girls Club in San Francisco, California, also known as Mission Neighborhood Capp St. Center, was built in 1911 in the Bay Area Tradition version of Shingle Style architecture.  It was listed on the National Register of Historic Places in 1979.

According to its NRHP nomination:"The Mission Neighborhood Capp Street Center is significant for the quality of its design and its role in the history of social movements in San Francisco. Built in 1911, the building is an excellent example of the First Bay Tradition. This regional interpretation of the Shingle Style was characterized by the use of shingles and stained wood and picturesque changes in spatial and axial arrangement. Its major practitioners were Ernest Coxhead, Willis Polk, Bernard Maybeck and Julia Morgan. The skillful execution of the design of the Mission Neighborhood Capp Street Center makes it a significant expression of this genre."

The building is a two-and-a-half-story wood-frame structure.  The 1911-built building with theatre was expanded by 1923 addition of a gymnasium, making a U-shaped complex.  There is an inner courtyard and a brick alley way.  The main entrance porch is capped with a Georgian-style broken pediment.  The upper stories' surface is dark brown shingles.  The theatre has small stage, a beamed ceiling and a balcony level.  After a fire in the 1940s a sprinkler system was added.

References

External links 
 Mission Neighborhood Centers, Inc. 362 Capp St. San Francisco, CA 94110

Women's club buildings in California
Buildings and structures in San Francisco
Mission District, San Francisco
Clubs and societies in California
Women's clubs in the United States
Buildings and structures completed in 1911
Clubhouses on the National Register of Historic Places in California
National Register of Historic Places in San Francisco
History of women in California
Shingle Style architecture in California
Theatres in San Francisco